In the mathematical subject of group theory, the Howson property, also known as the finitely generated intersection property (FGIP), is the property of a group saying that the intersection of any two finitely generated subgroups of this group is again finitely generated. The property is named after Albert G. Howson who in a 1954 paper established that free groups have this property.

Formal definition

Examples and non-examples

Every finite group has the Howson property.
The group  does not have the Howson property. Therefore,  is not finitely generated. 
If  is a compact surface then the fundamental group  of  has the Howson property.
A free-by-(infinite cyclic group) , where , never has the Howson property.
In view of the recent proof of the Virtually Haken conjecture and the Virtually fibered conjecture for 3-manifolds, previously established results imply that if M is a closed hyperbolic 3-manifold then  does not have the Howson property. 
Among 3-manifold groups, there are many examples that do and do not have the Howson property. 3-manifold groups with the Howson property include fundamental groups of hyperbolic 3-manifolds of infinite volume, 3-manifold groups based on Sol and Nil geometries, as well as 3-manifold groups obtained by some connected sum and JSJ decomposition constructions.  
For every  the Baumslag–Solitar group  has the Howson property. 
If G is group where every finitely generated subgroup is Noetherian then G has the Howson property. In particular, all abelian groups and all nilpotent groups have the Howson property.  
Every polycyclic-by-finite group has the Howson property.
If  are groups with the Howson property then their free product  also has the Howson property. More generally, the Howson property is preserved under taking amalgamated free products and HNN-extension of groups with the Howson property over finite subgroups.
In general, the Howson property is rather sensitive to amalgamated products and HNN extensions over infinite subgroups.
Limit groups have the Howson property.
It is not known whether  has the Howson property.
Many small cancellation groups and Coxeter groups, satisfying the ``perimeter reduction" condition on their presentation, are locally quasiconvex word-hyperbolic groups and therefore have the Howson property.
One-relator groups , where  are also locally quasiconvex word-hyperbolic groups and therefore have the Howson property.
The Grigorchuk group G of intermediate growth does not have the Howson property.
The Howson property is not a first-order property, that is the Howson property cannot be characterized by a collection of first order group language formulas.
A free pro-p group  satisfies a topological version of the Howson property: If  are topologically finitely generated closed subgroups of  then their intersection  is topologically finitely generated.
For any fixed integers  a ``generic" -generator -relator group  has the property that for any -generated subgroups  their intersection  is again finitely generated.
The wreath product  does not have the Howson property.
 Thompson's group  does not have the Howson property, since it contains .

See also
Hanna Neumann conjecture

References

Group theory
Algebra